Anton Berge (29 October 1892  –  4 July 1951) was a Norwegian agronomist and politician for the Labour Party.

He was born in Gjemnes.

He was elected to the Norwegian Parliament from Østfold in 1950. However, less than a year into his term he died and was replaced by Karl Henry Karlsen.

Berge was a member of the executive committee of Råde municipality council in the periods 1928–1931 and 1931–1934, and was a regular municipality council member in 1925–1928 and 1937–1940.

References

1892 births
1951 deaths
Labour Party (Norway) politicians
Members of the Storting
20th-century Norwegian politicians